Albertocetus is an extinct genus of primitive odontocete cetacean from late Oligocene (Chattian) marine deposits in North Carolina, and belonging to the family Xenorophidae.

Description
Albertocetus is distinguished from other xenorophids in having a large lacrimal bone, a steep ascending process of the maxilla, a short but present intertemporal constriction with a sagittal crest, and a tall median ridge on the premaxilla. The teeth were heterodont, and may have been polydont, because other xenorophids are polydont.

References

Oligocene cetaceans
Fossil taxa described in 2008